Poon Man Chun (born 27 April 1977) is a Hong Kong football manager who is last known to have been assistant manager of Shenzhen Bogang.

Career

Playing career

Poon started his career with Hong Kong top flight side Hong Kong Rangers. In 2001, he signed for Fukien in the Hong Kong second division, helping them earn promotion to the Hong Kong top flight.

Managerial career

In 2014, Poon was appointed assistant manager of Hong Kong club Wong Tai Sin, where he said, "When I first debuted, I had a poor relationship with the media and the class owner. Naturally, my player career was not ideal." In 2018, Poon was appointed manager of Meixian Tiehan in the Chinese second division, becoming the first Hong Kong manager in Chinese professional football, where he said, " "The pace of the Mainland is slow, and I don't have many friends , it's really difficult to adapt. But at that time, I thought of learning from the Mainland and paving the way for my coaching career. I didn't consider whether my income would be more than that of Hong Kong." In 2019, he was appointed assistant manager of Chinese third division team Shenzhen Bogang.

References

External links

 

Hong Kong footballers
Association football forwards
Hong Kong football managers
1977 births
Living people
Expatriate football managers in China
Hong Kong international footballers
Hong Kong Rangers FC players
Yee Hope players
Shek Kip Mei SA players